Tibberton may refer to:

Tibberton, Gloucestershire
Tibberton, Shropshire
Tibberton, Worcestershire